Guðmundur Kristján Bjarnason (born 9 October 1944) is an Icelandic politician and former minister.

External links 
 Non auto-biography of Guðmundur Kristján Bjarnason on the parliament website

1944 births
Gudmundur Kristjan Bjarnason
Living people
Place of birth missing (living people)